Kotwal Ashvinbhai Laxmanbhai (born 21 October 1964), also known as Ashvin Kotwal or Ashvinkumar Kotval is an Indian farmer and politician who has served in the Gujarat Legislative Assembly since 2007, representing Khedbrahma. Kotwal is also an Adivasi tribal leader.

On 2 May 2022, Kotwal defected from the Indian National Congress and joined the Bharatiya Janata Party. Kotwal defected because INC refused to give him the role of Leader of the Opposition in the Gujarat Legislative Assembly, selecting Sukhram Rathva instead.

References

Living people
Former members of Indian National Congress from Gujarat
Gujarat MLAs 2007–2012
Gujarat MLAs 2012–2017
1964 births
Gujarat MLAs 2017–2022

Bharatiya Janata Party politicians from Gujarat
Indian National Congress politicians from Gujarat